Lucas or LUCAS may refer to:

People
 Lucas (surname)
 Lucas (given name)

Arts and entertainment
 Luca Family Singers, also known as "lucas ligner en torsk"
 Lucas (album) (2007), an album by Skeletons and the Kings of All Cities
 Lucas (film) (1986) an American romantic-comedy teen film
 Lucas (novel) (2003), by Kevin Brooks
 Lucas (Mother 3), a playable character in Mother 3 and the Super Smash Bros. series since Brawl

Organisations 
 Lucas Industries, a former British manufacturer of motor industry and aerospace industry components
 Lucasfilm, an American film and television production company
 LucasVarity, a defunct British automotive parts manufacturer, successor to Lucas Industries

Mathematics 
 Lucas number, a series of integers similar to the Fibonacci number

Places

Australia
 Lucas, Victoria

Mexico
 Cabo San Lucas, Baja California

United States
 Lucas, Illinois
 Lucas, Iowa
 Lucas County, Iowa
 Lucas, Kansas
 Lucas, Kentucky
 Lucas, Missouri
 Lucas, Ohio
 Lucas County, Ohio
 Lucas, South Dakota
 Lucas, Texas
 Lucas, Wisconsin
 Lucas, West Virginia
 Lucas Township (disambiguation)

Other uses
 A. B. Lucas Secondary School, London, Ontario, Canada
 Leeds University Centre for African Studies, an interdisciplinary centre at the University of Leeds
 Lucas critique, in economics
 Laboratory Unit for Computer Assisted Surgery, a system used for surgical planning, in computer assisted surgery
 Lucas Oil Stadium, a venue for sporting events in the United States city of Indianapolis, Indiana
 LUCAS device, A Cardiopulmonary Assist Service used in Emergency Medicine

See also
 Luca (disambiguation)
 Lucas & Steve, a Dutch DJ duo
 Justice Lucas (disambiguation)
 Lukas, a form of the Latin name Lucas
 Łukasz, a Polish masculine given name
 Leuchars, a town and parish in Scotland
 De Lucas, a surname
 Luke (disambiguation)